Spirapril, sold under the brand name Renormax among others, is an ACE inhibitor antihypertensive drug used to treat hypertension. It belongs to dicarboxy group of ACE inhibitors.

It was patented in 1980 and approved for medical use in 1995.

Chemistry
Like many ACE inhibitors, this prodrug is converted to the active metabolite spiraprilat following oral administration. Unlike other members of the group, it is eliminated both by renal and hepatic routes, which may allow for greater use in patients with renal impairment.
However, data on its effect upon the renal function are conflicting.

References

External links

ACE inhibitors
Carboxamides
Enantiopure drugs
Ethyl esters
Nitrogen heterocycles
Prodrugs
Spiro compounds
Dithiolanes